A referendum on privatisation was held in Slovenia on 19 January 2003. Voters were asked whether Slovenian Railways should be kept as a single company during the privatisation process and whether subscribers to Telekom Slovenije should receive a rebate for the above market price fees paid for cable TV prior to privatisation. The railways question was rejected by 51.9% of voters, whilst the Telekom proposal was approved by 77.6% of voters. Voter turnout was only 31%.

Results

Slovenian Railways

Telekom Slovenije

References

2003 referendums
Referendums in Slovenia
2003 in Slovenia
Privatisation referendums
Privatisation in Slovenia
January 2003 events in Europe